This article presents lists of the literary events and publications in 1671.

Events
February – Nell Gwyn retires from the stage and moves into a brick townhouse at 79 Pall Mall, London. 
November 9 – The Duke's Company open their new venue, the Dorset Garden Theatre.
Antoinette du Ligier de la Garde Deshoulières is awarded the first prize given for poetry by the Académie française.
Philosophus Autodidactus, the first Latin translation of Ibn Tufail's 12th century tale Hayy ibn Yaqdhan, prepared by Edward Pococke before 1660, is published for the first time.

New books

Prose
Edward Bagshaw (attributed) – The Life and Death of Mr Vavasor Powell
Edward Burrough (posthumously): The Memorable Works of a Son of Thunder and Consolation: Namely, that True Prophet, and Faithful Servant of God, and Sufferer for the Testimony of Jesus, Edward Burroughs...
Johann Ferdinand Hertodt – Crocologia
John Josselyn – New England's Rarities, discovered in Birds, Beasts, Fishes, Serpents, and Plants of that Country (London)
Gottfried Leibniz – Hypothesis Physica Nova (`New Physical Hypothesis')
Pierre Martin de La Martinière – Voyage des pays septentrionaux (A New Voyage to the North)
Arnoldus Montanus – De nieuwe en Onbekende Weereld of Beschryving van America (The Unknown New World or Description of the Continent America)
Isaac Newton – Method of Fluxions
Jane Sharp – The Midwives Book: or the Whole Art of Midwifry Discovered
Marie-Catherine de Villedieu – Les Amours des Grands Hommes

Children
James Janeway – A Token for Children (two parts)

Drama
Aphra Behn – The Amorous Prince (adapted from Robert Davenport's The City Nightcap)
John Caryll – Sir Solomon Single
Pierre Corneille – Tite et Bérénice
 John Corye –  The Generous Enemies 
John Crowne 
 Charles VIII of France
 Juliana
John Dryden – The Assignation, or Love in a Nunnery
Edward Howard – The Six Days' Adventure
Elizabeth Polwheele – The Frolicks
Samuel Pordage – Herod and Mariamne
Edward Ravenscroft – Mamamouchi
 Edward Revet – The Town Shifts
Elkanah Settle – Cambyses
George Villiers, 2nd Duke of Buckingham & others – The Rehearsal
William Wycherley – Love in a Wood
Pedro Calderon de la Barca – El santo rey don Fernando

Poetry
John Milton – Samson Agonistes

Births
April 6 – Jean-Baptiste Rousseau, French dramatist and poet (died 1741)
September 7 – Antoine Danchet, French dramatist and poet (died 1748)
November 6 – Colley Cibber, English playwright and Poet Laureate (died 1757)
Unknown date – Gustaf Adlerfelt, Swedish historian (died 1709)
Unknown date, possibly 1672 – Sarah Dixon, English poet (died 1765)

Deaths
January 1 – Hardouin de Péréfixe de Beaumont, French historian and cleric (born 1606)
January 22 – Odorico Raynaldi, Italian historian (born 1595)
February 22 – Adam Olearius, German librarian and scholar (born 1603)
July 14 – Méric Casaubon, Swiss-born English classicist (born 1599)
September 28 – Jean de Montigny, French philosopher and poet (born 1636)
December 28 – Johann Friedrich Gronovius, German classicist (born 1611)

References

 
Years of the 17th century in literature